Bartholomeus Maurits Mauk Weber (1 March 1914 - 14 April 1978) was a Dutch football defender who played for Netherlands in the 1934 and 1938 FIFA World Cups. He also played for ADO Den Haag.

References

External links
 FIFA profile

1914 births
1978 deaths
Dutch footballers
Netherlands international footballers
Association football defenders
ADO Den Haag players
1934 FIFA World Cup players
1938 FIFA World Cup players
Footballers from The Hague